Ngallagunda is a medium-sized Aboriginal community, located in the Kimberley region of Western Australia, within the Shire of Wyndham-East Kimberley.

Native title 
The community is located within the fully determined Wanjina-Wunggurr Wilinggin (WAD6016/96) native title claim area.

Governance 
The community is managed through its incorporated body, Ngallagunda Aboriginal Corporation, incorporated under the Aboriginal Councils and Associations Act 1976 on 13 October 1989.

Town planning 
Ngallagunda Layout Plan No.2 has been prepared in accordance with State Planning Policy 3.2 Aboriginal Settlements. Layout Plan No.2 was endorsed by the community on 7 July 2010 and the Western Australian Planning Commission on 14 December 2010. The Layout Plan map-set and background report can be viewed at Planning Western Australia's website.

Climate
The nearby Mount Elizabeth Weather Station is the most northerly place in Australia to record a temperature below freezing. It dropped to -1.3 °C (29.7 °F) on 26 June 1998. This is also the lowest temperature recorded in the Kimberly region.

<div style="width:75%;">

References

External links
 Office of the Registrar of Indigenous Corporations
 Native Title Claimant application summary

Towns in Western Australia
Aboriginal communities in Kimberley (Western Australia)